Chelopek is a village in Vratsa Municipality, Vratsa Province in northwestern Bulgaria. Located in the western Balkan Mountains, it is known as the home village of Ivan Vazov's heroine Baba Iliytsa from the tale One Bulgarian Woman. Her original timbed-framed house has been reconstructed and is currently a museum of her life and local history and ethnography.

Gallery

Villages in Vratsa Province